Hesketh Park railway station was on the West Lancashire Railway in England. It was close to Hesketh Park in Southport.

History
The station opened in 1878. The line to Preston closed on 7 September 1964, having been steam operated until the end. The electric service to Southport & Liverpool was withdrawn at the same time, though freight traffic continued until 1967.

References

Disused railway stations in the Metropolitan Borough of Sefton
Buildings and structures in Southport
Former Lancashire and Yorkshire Railway stations
Beeching closures in England
Railway stations in Great Britain opened in 1878
Railway stations in Great Britain closed in 1964